Pyrausta syfanialis is a moth in the family Crambidae. It was described by Oberthür in 1893. It is found in China (Tibet).

References

Moths described in 1893
syfanialis
Moths of Asia